15 Minutes is a 2001 film starring Robert De Niro and Edward Burns.

15 Minutes may also refer to:

Music
 15 Minutes (band), a 1981 rock group formed by Steve Wynn and members of Alternate Learning
 15 Minutes (Barry Manilow album), 2011
 15 Minutes (Nik Kershaw album), 1999

 "15 Minutes" (Rodney Atkins song), 2009
 "15 Minutes" (The Yeah You's song), 2009
 "15 Minutes", a song by Michelle Williams from the album Do You Know, 2004
 "15 Minutes", a song by The Strokes from the album First Impressions of Earth, 2005
 "15 Minutes", a song by Demi Lovato from the album Dancing with the Devil... the Art of Starting Over, 2021

Other uses
 15 minutes of fame, short-lived, often ephemeral, media publicity or celebrity
 Every 15 Minutes, a Canadian/US drinking-and-driving prevention program

See also
 Fifteen Minutes (disambiguation)